Alejandro "Álex" Gutiérrez Mozo (born 22 April 1995) is a Spanish footballer who plays as a central midfielder for CD Móstoles URJC.

Club career
Born in Madrid, Spain, Mozo represented CD Coslada and RSD Alcalá as a youth. He made his senior debut with the latter during the 2013–14 season in Tercera División, but after appearing sparingly he moved to CD Leganés in January 2014, returning to youth setup.

Mozo featured regularly with the reserves in the following years, helping in their promotion to the fourth tier in 2015. On 1 September of that year, he moved to fellow fourth division side UB Conquense.

After narrowly missing out promotion, Mozo returned to Leganés and its B-team. He made his first team – and La Liga – debut on 28 February 2018, coming on as a half-time substitute for Gabriel Pires in a 0–4 away loss against Atlético Madrid.

References

External links
Leganés profile 
Fútbol Manchego profile 

1995 births
Living people
People from Cuenca, Spain
Sportspeople from the Province of Cuenca
Spanish footballers
Footballers from Castilla–La Mancha
Association football midfielders
La Liga players
Tercera División players
CD Leganés B players
UB Conquense footballers
CD Leganés players
Arandina CF players
CD Móstoles URJC players